Peter Beck is the New Zealand founder of Rocket Lab.

Peter Beck may also refer to:

Peter Beck (German politician) (born 1967), member of the Bürgerschaft of Bremen
Peter Beck (luger) (born 1965), Liechtenstein luger
Peter Beck (Ohio politician) (born 1952), Republican member of the House of Representatives of Ohio, United States
Peter Beck (priest) (born 1948/49), local body politician and former dean of ChristChurch Cathedral in Christchurch, New Zealand
Peter Beck (schoolmaster) (1909–2002), English headmaster
Peter Beck, Australian television producer, see Shaun Micallef's Mad as Hell

See also
Beck (surname)